Yuri Mikhailovich Neprintsev (August 15, 1909 – October 20, 1996) was a Soviet, later Russian, painter, graphic artist, art teacher, professor of the Repin Institute of Arts, People's Artist of USSR, and a member of the Academy of Arts of the USSR. He lived and worked in Leningrad and is regarded by art historian Sergei V. Ivanov as one of the brightest representatives of the Leningrad school of painting, most famous for his genre and battle paintings.

Biography 
Yuri Mikhailovich Neprintsev was born August 15, 1909, in Tbilisi, Georgia, Russian Empire. He came from the nobility. His father, Neprintsev Mikhail Nikolaevich was an architect, a Honored Art Worker of Science and Technology of the Georgian SSR (1946).

In 1926, Neprintsev went to Leningrad to continue his education. In the years 1926–1930, he studied of Prof. Vasily Savinsky private art studio. In 1929, Neprintsev began to work as designer and graphic artist in the palace-museums of Leningrad and the Pushkin town. In the years 1932–1934, he worked as illustrator for magazines and publishing houses of Leningrad.

In 1934, Neprintsev entered at the third course of painting department of the Leningrad Institute of Painting, Sculpture and Architecture. He studied of Pavel Naumov, Alexander Lubimov, and Isaak Brodsky, who 30 years ago was also a student of Vasily Savinsky.

Together with Neprintsev, in Isaak Brodsky workshop, studied such famous Russian artists as Nikolai Timkov, Piotr Belousov, Alexander Laktionov, Piotr Vasiliev, Mikhail Kozell, and others.

In 1938, Neprintsev graduated from Leningrad Institute of Painting, Sculpture and Architecture in the workshop of Isaak Brodsky. His graduation work was a painting named "Alexander Pushkin in Mikhailovskoe village", devoted to the memory of the great Russian poet Alexander Pushkin (1799–1837). In 1940 Neprintsev was admitted to the Leningrad Union of Artists.

Starting in 1928, Neprintsev participated in Art Exhibitions. He painted portraits, genre and historical compositions, and landscapes. Yuri Neprintsev worked in oil painting, pencil drawings, watercolors and book illustration. Solo exhibitions by Neprintsev were in 1959 (Moscow, Leningrad, Sverdlovsk, Gorky, and Saratov), and in 1989 (Leningrad).

After graduation, Neprintsev continued his education in postgraduate institute under leadership of Prof. Rudolf Frentz and Prof. Boris Ioganson. At the same time he taught at the Department of the Drawing.

In 1941, Neprintsev voluntarily joined the Red Army. He fought in the Second World War, serving in the Baltic Fleet. In 1944, Neprintsev was awarded the Order of the Red Star. He had demobilized in 1946.

In the postwar years, Neprintsev created a series of paintings devoted to the heroic struggle of the Soviet people against Nazi Germany: "The last grenade" (1948), "Lisa Chaikina" (1949), "Rest after the battle. Vasily Terkin" (1951, Stalin Prize of the first degree (1952), "The story of the father" (1955).

The outstanding work of art by Yuri Neprintsev was painting "Rest after the battle. Vasily Terkin". It by means of painting skillfully expressed the idea of the spiritual unity of the people in wartime. The painting entered the golden fund of Soviet art, as one of the best embodiment of the image of Soviet man.

The original version of painting "Rest after the battle. Vasily Terkin" (1951) was given for Mao Zedong. In 1953 the second version was painted by Neprintsev for the Kremlin. In 1955 he painted the third version for the Tretyakov Gallery.

Over the 50 years, Neprintsev combined his creative activities with pedagogical work. He taught in the Leningrad Institute of Painting, Sculpture and Architecture named after Ilya Repin since 1938. He was professor of painting (1954–1996), a head of personal workshop and graphical department of Repin Institute of Arts.

In 1953, Neprintsev was elected Corresponding Member of Academy of Arts of the USSR, and in 1970 he was elected member of the Academy of Arts of the USSR.

In 1956 he was awarded the honorary title of Honored Art Worker of Russian Federation, and in 1963 he was awarded the honorary title of People's Artist of USSR.

In 1969 Neprintsev was awarded the Order of Red Banner of Labour, and in 1979 – the Order of Lenin.

Yuri Neprintsev was a member of the Saint Petersburg Union of Artists (before 1992 – the Leningrad branch of Union of Artists of Russian Federation) since 1938.

Yuri Mikhailovich Neprintsev died on October 20, 1996, in Saint Petersburg. Paintings by Yuri Neprintsev are in State Russian Museum, State Treryakov Gallery, in the numerous Art museums and private collections in Russia, France, England, USA, China, Ukraine, Italy, Japan, and other countries.

See also

 Fine Art of Leningrad
 Leningrad School of Painting
 List of Russian artists
 List of 20th-century Russian painters
 List of painters of Saint Petersburg Union of Artists
 Saint Petersburg Union of Artists

References

Bibliography 
 Directory of members of the Leningrad branch of Union of Artists of Russian Federation. - Leningrad: Khudozhnik RSFSR, 1987. - p. 91.
 Matthew C. Bown. Dictionary of 20th Century Russian and Soviet Painters 1900-1980s. - London: Izomar, 1998. , .
 Vern G. Swanson. Soviet Impressionism. - Woodbridge, England: Antique Collectors' Club, 2001. - pp. 63, 115. - 303 p. , .
 Sergei V. Ivanov. Unknown Socialist Realism. The Leningrad School. - Saint Petersburg: NP-Print Edition, 2007. – pp. 9, 15, 18–20, 27–29, 358, 359, 361, 362, 366–370, 381, 382, 384, 386–392, 394, 395, 397–403, 405, 410–423, 443, 445. , .
 Иванов С. Инвестиции в советскую живопись: ленинградская школа // Петербургские искусствоведческие тетради. Вып. 31. СПб, 2014. С.54-60.

1909 births
1996 deaths
Soviet painters
Socialist realist artists
Leningrad School artists
Repin Institute of Arts alumni
People's Artists of the USSR (visual arts)
Members of the Leningrad Union of Artists